The 2013 Allsvenskan, part of the 2013 Swedish football season, was the 89th season of Allsvenskan since its establishment in 1924. The 2013 fixtures were released on 14 December 2012. The season started on 31 March 2013 and ended on 3 November 2013. IF Elfsborg were the defending champions, having won their sixth title the previous season.

Malmö FF won the Swedish championship this season, their 20th Allsvenskan title and 17th Swedish championship overall, in the 29th round on 28 October 2013 when they won 2–0 in the away fixture against reigning champions IF Elfsborg at Borås Arena. This was Malmö FF's third Swedish championship of the 21st century having won their last title in the 2010 Allsvenskan season.

A total of 16 teams contested the league: 13 returning from the 2012 season and three that were promoted from Superettan.

Summary

Background
The annual pre-season kick-off meeting was held in Stockholm on 25 March 2013. All managers accompanied with a key player for their team were interviewed by the two hosts Petter Johansson and Jens Fjellström about the upcoming season and their expectations as well as what team they held as favourites to win the title. Hans Backe acted as a commentator and did a short analysis after each of the teams presentation. Only Malmö FF's Rikard Norling held his own team as the title favourite. Eight managers out of 16 believed that IF Elfsborg would win the title. The remaining managers placed their bets on AIK (three votes), Malmö FF (two votes), IFK Göteborg (two votes) and BK Häcken (one vote). The entire attendance consisted of the clubs' managers, key players and media experts. When asked about Elfsborg's chances to defend their title, only 36.5% of the audience believed that they could. The attendance voted IF Elfsborg as the title favourites (29.7% of the votes) with Malmö FF (22.4% of the votes) and AIK (14.5% of the votes) closely after. The attendance also predicted that Syrianska FC (33.4% of the votes) and IF Brommapojkarna (30.1% of the votes) were the two favourites to be relegated. When asked about the top goalscorer, a majority of the audience voted for Djurgårdens IF's Erton Fejzullahu. For the top assisting player the audience placed their bets on BK Häcken's Martin Ericsson.

Season overview
The season started on 31 March 2013 with three fixtures. The first match to be played was the Gothenburg derby between BK Häcken and IFK Göteborg which was moved to Ullevi for this specific match, the match ended in a 3–0 win for last years 7th positioned IFK Göteborg. The remaining five fixtures of the first week were played on 1 April 2013 with the match between the reigning champions IF Elfsborg against one of the title favourites AIK at Borås Arena as the most prominent fixture that day, the matched in a 2–2 draw.

Early on IFK Göteborg established themselves in first position after a win in the second round and didn't lose a match until in the seventh round in the away game against AIK, this match was also the first league match AIK won at their new home ground Friends Arena. Helsingborgs IF overtook Göteborg as leaders in the same round. Until the seventh round the main top teams had been Malmö FF who had held onto second position from the third round, Helsingborg, and surprisingly Mjällby AIF. The reigning champions and title favourites Elfsborg started the season with four drawn matches in a row before finally managing a win in the fifth round against Djurgårdens IF. The remaining title favourites AIK and Häcken were positioned 9th and 7th respectively after seven rounds. The teams that were voted most likely to be relegated Syrianska FC and IF Brommapojkarna were positioned 14th and 15th respectively after seven rounds with under-performing Djurgårdens IF occupying 16th and last place.

After the seventh round Helsingborg continued their streak of wins which ensured them to stay in pole position after ten matches had been played. A draw in the Scanian derby against Malmö FF on 29 May ended their winning run of six matches, this was also Malmö's fifth match without winning since their win against Östers IF in the fifth round. This streak of matches made Malmö FF drop to fourth place in the league after ten rounds. In the same time IFK Göteborg had continued to collect points despite their loss against AIK and were two points after leaders Helsingborg in second place. Elfsborg had also overtaken Malmö FF after four straight wins after their four initial draws in the start of the league. AIK and Häcken were still stuck in no man's land in the middle of the table after ten rounds, positioning themselves 10th and 9th respectively. In the other end of the table Syrianska and Brommapojkarna had managed to improve their form and were positioned 13th and 12th respectively. The two last teams after ten rounds were Öster and Djurgården.

In the coming ten rounds a quartet of teams would establish themselves as favourites for the league title. The positions in the top started to change around the 16th round of games when AIK managed to gain contact with the top teams and cling on to a third position in the table, passing IFK Göteborg in the process. Malmö FF gained momentum in the top and rose to a second place while Helsingborg where still top of the table. Elfsborg dropped to a fifth place. After the 20th round the same four teams still topped the table. Malmö FF passed Helsinborg in the same round and took the lead for the first time this season, three points ahead of Helsingborg. IFK Göteborg and AIK were placed third and fourth respectively on the same number of points as Helsingborg, 38 points, although with lesser goal difference. Elfsborg followed in fifth place, seven points after Helsingborg, IFK Göteborg and AIK and ten points after Malmö FF. One of the biggest upsets this far in the season was last years runners up and one of the title favourites, Häcken. Häcken was twenty points behind Malmö FF at this point of the season and in 12th position with only three points ahead of the relegation zone. In the battle to avoid relegation Syrianska and Brommapojkarna were placed 15th and 16th respectively in the relegation positions with Halmstad in 14th place. Syrianska had only managed to collect ten points at this point and were eight points behind Brommapojkarna and Halmstad who both had 18 points. Djurgården who had started the season in the relegation zone managed to escape upwards in the table in the 11th week of games and were placed 10th after 20 rounds.

During the last ten rounds of the league Malmö FF, Helsingborg, IFK Göteborg and AIK continued to battle for the title. The most important developments happened in the 24th and 25th round when IFK Göteborg first defeated AIK at home and in the next week Malmö FF proceeded to win against Helsingborg away. Malmö had also defeated IFK Göteborg at home in the 21st round. At this point Malmö was one point ahead of IFK Göteborg, six points ahead of Helsingborg and eight points ahead of AIK. Although it seemed obvious that Malmö FF and IFK Göteborg were the only title contender left at this point, AIK would continue to chase the two teams while Helsingborg would continue to drop. In the other end of the table Syrianska was confirmed for relegation after a loss against fellow relegation competitor Brommapojkarna in the 26th round. Östers IF was dragged into the relegation battle as Brommapojkarna rose up the table. In the last round Halmstad drew against Brommapojkarna to confirm the relegation of Öster, Halmstad qualified for the relegation play-offs against GIF Sundsvall who finished third in 2013 Superettan and Brommapojkarna managed to stay in the league.

Both Malmö FF and IFK Göteborg lost their matches in the 27th round while Helsingborg and AIK won their matches, making the title race live into the last rounds. However, as Malmö FF still held the lead they had a chance to secure the title with two wins in the last three rounds. After winning at home against Brommapojkarna in the 28th round after a late goal Malmö travelled to reigning champions Elfsborg in Borås to clinch the title in the 29th round. Up until this point AIK had continued to win while Helsingborg and IFK Göteborg had staggered making AIK the only title contender left. It was highly uncertain if the match in Borås would be played as the St Jude storm had made weather conditions in the south west of Sweden unfit for football. However the match was played and Malmö FF won the match and thus the league title with a 2–0 result after two goals by Guillermo Molins. This result also confirmed AIK as runners-up and the last round of the league would only determine which of IFK Göteborg, Helsingborg and Kalmar FF would take the third and final European qualifier position in the table. IFK Göteborg managed to finished third by winning for the first time in five rounds. Kalmar passed Helsingborg in the last round to claim the bronze medal.

Reigning champions Elfsborg finished sixth and BK Häcken, previously one of the favourites for the title prior to the season, finished 10th. Helsingborgs Imad Khalili, who had belonged to IFK Norrköping for half of the season, became top scorer with 15 goals as he scored on a penalty in the 90th minute of the last match. The favourite to become top scorer prior to the season, Djurgårdens Erton Fejzullahu, scored seven goals. Malmö FF's Magnus Eriksson made the most assists with 14, Eriksson also made the most points with 25, this included 11 goals and 14 assists. BK Häcken's Martin Ericsson, who was the favourite prior to the season to make the most assists, finished the season with four assists.

Allsvenskans stora pris
For the first time in the league's history, the broadcaster of Allsvenskan, C More Entertainment, hosted an award ceremony where they presented seven awards and two special awards to the players and staff of the 16 Allsvenskan clubs, the award ceremony was held on 8 November 2013. Usually some of the awards from the annual "Fotbollsgalan" hosted by the Swedish Football Association included Allsvenskan players. "Fotbollsgalan" also introduced an "Allsvenskan player of the year" award in recent years, however that award will no longer be awarded due to the introduction of Allsvenskans stora pris. The nominations for the 2013 season were officially announced on 6 November 2013. Nominees are displayed below, the winners are marked in bold text.

Goalkeeper of the year
Etrit Berisha (Kalmar FF)
John Alvbåge (IFK Göteborg)
Johan Dahlin (Malmö FF)

Defender of the year
Per Karlsson (AIK)
Pontus Jansson (Malmö FF)
Miiko Albornoz (Malmö FF)

Midfielder of the year
Jiloan Hamad (Malmö FF)
Celso Borges (AIK)
Jakob Johansson (IFK Göteborg)

Forward of the year
Tobias Hysén (IFK Göteborg)
Magnus Eriksson (Malmö FF)
Moestafa El Kabir (BK Häcken)

Newcomer of the year
Melker Hallberg (Kalmar FF)
Daniel Amartey (Djurgårdens IF)
Simon Gustafson (BK Häcken)

Manager of the year
Rikard Norling (Malmö FF)
Per-Mathias Høgmo (Djurgårdens IF)
Nanne Bergstrand (Kalmar FF)

Most valuable player of the year
Tobias Hysén (IFK Göteborg)
Magnus Eriksson (Malmö FF)
Jiloan Hamad (Malmö FF)

Teams
A total of sixteen teams contested the league, including thirteen sides from the 2012 season and three promoted teams from the 2012 Superettan. One of the two promoted teams for the 2012 season managed to stay in the league, Åtvidabergs FF.

Örebro SK and GAIS were relegated at the end of the 2012 season after finishing in the bottom two places of the table. They were replaced by 2012 Superettan champions Östers IF and runners-up IF Brommapojkarna. Öster returned to Allsvenskan after five seasons after their relegation in 2006, two which were spent in the third tier. Brommapojkarna participated in their fourth Allsvenskan season, they last played in Allsvenskan during the 2010 season. This was notably the first time Brommapojkarna were promoted directly without play-offs.

GIF Sundsvall as 14th-placed team lost their Allsvenskan spot after losing to third-placed Superettan team Halmstads BK 6–4 on aggregate in a relegation/promotion playoff. This was the first time since 2008 that the Superettan team beat the Allsvenskan team and only the fourth time since the play-offs between Allsvenskan and Superettan was introduced in 2000. Halmstad made their Allsvenskan return after only one season in Superettan, having been relegated at the end of the 2011 season.

Stadia and locations

 1 According to each club information page at the Swedish Football Association website for Allsvenskan.

Personnel and kits

Note: Flags indicate national team as has been defined under FIFA eligibility rules. Players and Managers may hold more than one non-FIFA nationality.

 1 According to each club information page at the Swedish Football Association website for Allsvenskan.
 2 Syrianska FC's Özcan Melkemichel had the title Manager while Klebér Saarenpää had the title Head coach, the team selection was done by Melkemichel.

Managerial changes

Suspended matches
The 2013 Allsvenskan season encountered one incident involving thrown items and supporter violence, with that match needing to be suspended. This was the first time an Allsvenskan match was suspended since the troublesome 2011 Allsvenskan season when three matches had to be suspended.

Djurgårdens IF vs. Mjällby AIF
The match on 8 April 2013 at Stockholms Stadion between Djurgårdens IF and Mjällby AIF was suspended after 37 minutes of play, after Mjällby had scored the first goal of the match. Following the goal, several supporters started throwing items on the pitch. Mjällby defender Gbenga Arokoyo was hit in the stomach by a pear thrown by a supporter while celebrating Mjällby's goal. On 12 April 2013 the Swedish Football Association (SvFF) announced that the match would continue at a later date and that play would resume at the specific minute and with the standing result when the original match was suspended. No attendance would have been allowed. Djurgården was also given a 15,000 SEK fine. Mjällby filed an appeal for a 3–0 fixed result in their favour on 26 April 2013, and on 7 May 2013 the SvFF decided to award Mjällby a 3–0 fixed-result victory for the match.

League table

Positions by round

Note: Some matches were played out of phase with the corresponding round, positions were corrected in hindsight.

Results

Relegation play-offs

Halmstads BK won 3–2 on aggregate.

Season statistics

Top scorers

Top assists

Top goalkeepers

(Minimum of 10 games played)

Hat-tricks

 4 Player scored 4 goals

Scoring
First goal of the season: Jakob Johansson for IFK Göteborg against BK Häcken (31 March 2013)
Fastest goal of the season: 28 seconds, Stefan Selaković for Halmstads BK against Kalmar FF (21 April 2013)
Latest goal of the season: 94 minutes and 45 seconds, Kennedy Igboananike for AIK against Gefle IF (22 April 2013)
Largest winning margin: 6 goals
IF Elfsborg 6–0 IF Brommapojkarna (23 May 2013)
IF Brommapojkarna 0–6 AIK (26 October 2013)
Highest scoring game: 7 goals
Mjällby AIF 4–3 Helsingborgs IF (19 August 2013)
IFK Norrköping 6–1 Syrianska FC (1 September 2013)
Most goals scored in a match by a single team: 6 goals
IF Elfsborg 6–0 IF Brommapojkarna (23 May 2013)
IF Brommapojkarna 0–6 AIK (26 October 2013)
Most goals scored in a match by a losing team: 3 goals
Mjällby AIF 4–3 Helsingborgs IF (19 August 2013)
Fewest games failed to score in: 3
Helsingborgs IF
Malmö FF
Most games failed to score in: 12
BK Häcken
Syrianska FC

Clean sheets
Most clean sheets: 13
Åtvidabergs FF
Fewest clean sheets: 2
IFK Norrköping
Syrianska FC

Discipline
Worst overall disciplinary record (1 pt per yellow card, 3 pts per red card): 72
Syrianska FC (57 yellow cards, 5 red cards)
Best overall disciplinary record: 34
Gefle IF (28 yellow cards, 2 red cards)
Most yellow cards (club): 57
Halmstads BK
Syrianska FC
Most yellow cards (player): 9
Alexander Faltsetas (Gefle IF)
Fredrik Liverstam (Halmstads BK)
Most red cards (club):  6
Helsingborgs IF
IF Elfsborg
Most red cards (player): 2
Dominic Chatto (BK Häcken)
Gbenga Arokoyo (Mjällby AIF)
Jon Jönsson (IF Elfsborg)
Peter Larsson (Helsingborgs IF)
Most fouls (player): 57
Johan Persson (Östers IF)

Attendance

See also 

Competitions
 2013 Superettan
 2013 Division 1
 2012–13 Svenska Cupen
 2013 Svenska Supercupen

Team seasons
 2013 AIK Fotboll season
 2013 Djurgårdens IF season
 2013 Halmstads BK season
 2013 Malmö FF season

Transfers
 List of Swedish football transfers winter 2012–2013
 List of Swedish football transfers summer 2013

References

External links 

  

Allsvenskan seasons
Swed
Swed
1